Open J-Gate was a free database of open access journals, launched in February 2006, and hosted by Informatics Ltd. of India.

Informatics started metadata aggregation from open access journals as part of the development of J-Gate. Open J-Gate claimed to aggregate metadata from more than 4,000 open access journals published in the English language around the globe. Open J-Gate indexed articles from available e-journals in the open access domain, both from the scholarly and popular domains. It indexed peer-reviewed and non-peer reviewed professional magazines, as well as trade and industry journals.

See also
 List of open-access journals

References

 Issues In Scholarly Communication: News for the University of Illinois Community (March 1, 2006). Retrieved 5.09.2017.
 United Kingdom Serials Special Interest Group description of Open J-Gate 
 Chemical Informatics Letters, Volume 13, Issue 2; August 2006. Editor: Jonathan M Goodman. Retrieved 25.09.2017.

External links
 J-Gate

Bibliographic databases and indexes
Open-access archives
Publications established in 2006